Winston Hills is an electoral district of the Legislative Assembly in the Australian state of New South Wales. It is due to be contested for the first time at the 2023 election.

It is an urban electorate in Sydney's West, taking in the suburbs of Constitution Hill, Glenwood, Kings Langley, Lalor Park, Northmead, Old Toongabbie, Winston Hills and parts of Baulkham Hills, Blacktown, Pendle Hill, Seven Hills, Toongabbie and Wentworthville.

Winston Hills was created as a result of the 2021 redistribution and largely replaces the abolished electorate of Seven Hills. Based on the results of the 2019 election, it is estimated to have a notional margin of 5.7 percent for the Liberal Party.

References

External links
New South Wales Redistributions 2021

Electoral districts of New South Wales